Ipisa Wanega is a Papua New Guinean rugby league player who represented Papua New Guinea national rugby league team in multiple Rugby League World Cups.

Playing career
Wanega made his debut for Papua New Guinea in 1988 against Australia. He also played against the touring 1990 Great Britain Lions and 1991 Kangaroos. He finished his career with nine test matches and six goals.

Later years
Wanega is also a teacher and is the principal of Awaba High School. He is the patron of Dibili Rugby League.

References

Living people
Papua New Guinea national rugby league team players
Papua New Guinean educators
Papua New Guinean rugby league administrators
Papua New Guinean rugby league players
Papua New Guinean schoolteachers
Rugby league fullbacks
Year of birth missing (living people)